Henri André Lacassagne (27 December 1883 – 11 November 1916) was a French rugby union player. He played at scrum half for Stade Bordelais.

Career
Henri Lacassagne's first test was on 1 January 1906, against .

France played its first official match in the old Parc des Princes, against New Zealand. In their tour of the British Isles, the "All Blacks" accepted a challenge for a match in Paris. After playing their second match in Swansea on 30 December, they took the ferry to Boulogne-sur-Mer, then the train to the Gare du Nord. Fatigued by their voyage, and after a three-month tour, in which they won 31 of 32 matches, they won easily by 38–8 against France in front of 3000 spectators.

Henri Lacassagne played his last test match on 5 January 1907, against the England national rugby union team.

He was on the champion team of France in 1904, 1905, 1906, 1907 and a finalist in 1908.

Club
 SBUC

Highlights
Championnat de France

International
He played the first official match of the France national rugby union team in 1906, and a test match in 1907.

Notes and references

Further reading
  Collectif Midi olympique, Cent ans de XV de France , Midi olympique, 2005, 
 Godwin, Terry Complete Who's Who of International Rugby (Cassell, 1987)

External links
  ffr.fr
  finalesrugby.com

France international rugby union players
French rugby union players
1883 births
French military personnel killed in World War I
1916 deaths
Rugby union locks
Rugby union scrum-halves
Stade Bordelais players